Adelheid Herrmann (born April 15, 1953) is a Dena'ina Athabaskan researcher and politician. She is a shareholder in the Bristol Bay Native Corporation, one of the 13 Alaska Native corporations.

Early life and education
Herrmann is the granddaughter of Charles Herrmann (1893–1959) and Anna Gartelman Herrmann. Charles Herrmann was born in Kiel, Germany, migrated to San Francisco in 1910, and found employment in the Bristol Bay area of Alaska. Anna Gartelman was Aleut woman from Nushagak.

Adelheid was born in Levelock, Alaska on April 15, 1953, and grew up in Naknek, where she attended Bristol Bay High School. She earned a degree in public policy, fisheries, and Native American studies (1999) from  Antioch University and a D.Ed. in organizational leadership with an emphasis in fisheries and oceans (2013) from the University of La Verne in California.

Career
From 1983 to 1989 Herrmann was a member of the Alaska House of Representatives, representing Naknek for the Democrat Party in the 13th, 14th and 15th legislatures.

 she is a post-doctoral research assistant at the International Arctic Research Center (IARC) at the University of Alaska Fairbanks, where her areas of expertise are climate adaptation and social science.  She is also a member of the Council of Elders of Alaska Pacific University, a body whose mission is "to support, strengthen, and ensure the development, integration, and prioritization of encompassing Alaska Native knowledge, language, values, perspectives, history, and concerns in education at Alaska Pacific University".

References

Living people
Alaskan Athabaskans
Members of the Alaska House of Representatives
Native American state legislators in Alaska
Women state legislators in Alaska
University of Alaska Fairbanks people
Alaska Pacific University people
University of La Verne alumni
Antioch University alumni
20th-century American women politicians
20th-century American politicians
American people of German descent
20th-century Native American politicians
1953 births
21st-century Native American women
21st-century Native Americans
20th-century Native American women